The Fantasy Kingdom Complex, commonly known as Fantasy Kingdom, is an entertainment complex in Ashulia, Savar, Bangladesh. Opened on 19 February 2002, the theme park is owned and operated by Concord Entertainment Co. Ltd, a sister concern of Concord Group.

Locations 
Fantasy Kingdom Complex is built in Jamgora at Ashulia which is nearby Dhaka city. The property includes the cities of Ashulia and Savar which are governed by the Dhaka District. There are currently many routes available to reach Fantasy Kingdom.

Attractions

List of rides 

Fantasy Kingdom Theme Park has around 24 rides:
 Bumper Car
 Zuzu Train
 Whirly Bird
 Highway Convoy
 Giant Splash
 Happy Kangaroo
 Izzy Dizzy
 Sun & Moon
 3D Cinema
 Bull Dozer
 Santa Maria
 Kids' Bumper Car
 Magic Carpet
 Pony Adventure
 Roller Coaster
 Speed Way
 Vortex Tunnel
 Sky Hopper
 Bumper Boat
 Zip Around
 Igloo House
 Moving Tower
 Ferris Wheel
 Junior Ferris Wheel
 Redemption Game
 Rock n Roll and 9D Cinema are brand new ride has been added to Fantasy Kingdom Complex 

Water Kingdom 
A major attraction at Ashulia's Fantasy Kingdom complex is the Water Kingdom. This water park has slides, a wave pool, lazy rive. Water Kingdom is situated beside Fantasy Kingdom. Moreover, there are slide world, lazy river, family pool, multi-slide, and water pool, lost kingdom, play zone and dancing zone.

Xtreme Racing Go-Kart 
Fantasy Kingdom is introducing these world class Go-Karts at Fantasy Kingdom Complex, a world class experience on riding international standard go-karts for the first time in Bangladesh. These are the true racing karts which are used in 7-time champion of Formula One Michel Schumacher's go kart institute to train the racers.

See also 

 Tourism in Bangladesh
 Concord Group
 List of hotels and resorts in Bangladesh

References

External links 

 
Official Facebook Page

Tourism in Dhaka
Amusement parks in Bangladesh
2002 establishments in Bangladesh